Stoughton is an MBTA Commuter Rail station in downtown Stoughton, Massachusetts. It is the current terminus of the Stoughton Branch of the Providence/Stoughton Line. The station has a parking lot to serve local riders and those driving from further south, as Stoughton is close to the Massachusetts Route 24 expressway. Stoughton currently has one platform (split across Wyman Street) serving one track; the platform has a mini-high section for accessibility.

History

The original station house was built in 1888 for the Old Colony Railroad and has been listed on the National Register of Historic Places since January 21, 1974. In December 2018, the administration of Massachusetts Governor Charlie Baker announced a $75,000 grant to a restoration project of the original station house.

Plans
Stoughton station is proposed to be reconstructed as part of Phase 2 of the South Coast Rail project, which would extend the Stoughton Branch south to several South Coast cities in 2030. A second track would be added through the station to support increased bidirectional service; the two new platforms would be located fully south of Wyman Street so that trains do not block the crossing.

Due to a sharp curve, full-length high-level platforms were originally thought not to be feasible; instead, each platform was to have a 45-foot-long mini-high platform at the southern end.

Under newer plans, the tracks would be moved slightly west south of Wyman Street, so that full-length high-level platforms will be built a block south at Brock Street, connected with an overhead pedestrian bridge. A new parking area with nearly twice the number of spaces would be built; the old right-of-way and parking areas would be redeveloped. The town of Stoughton opposes the plan because it would increase rail traffic though grade crossings in downtown Stoughton.

See also
National Register of Historic Places listings in Norfolk County, Massachusetts
List of Old Colony Railroad stations

References

External links

MBTA - Stoughton
 (1969)
 (1982)
Station from Google Maps Street View

Railway stations on the National Register of Historic Places in Massachusetts
Romanesque Revival architecture in Massachusetts
MBTA Commuter Rail stations in Norfolk County, Massachusetts

Railway stations in the United States opened in 1845

Railway stations in the United States opened in 1888

Historic American Buildings Survey in Massachusetts
Historic American Engineering Record in Massachusetts
National Register of Historic Places in Norfolk County, Massachusetts
Former New York, New Haven and Hartford Railroad stations
1845 establishments in Massachusetts
Stoughton, Massachusetts